Billions is an American drama television series created by Brian Koppelman, David Levien, and Andrew Ross Sorkin. The series premiered on Showtime on January 17, 2016, and has produced six seasons to date. The series is set primarily in New York and Connecticut. 

The series tells the story of hedge fund manager Bobby Axelrod (Damian Lewis), as he accumulates wealth and power in the world of high finance. Axelrod's aggressive tactics to secure high returns frequently cross over into the illegal—acts that United States Attorney Chuck Rhoades (Paul Giamatti) attempts to prosecute. A large ensemble secondary cast supports the series' story arcs.

Some plotlines mirror real-life prosecutions of financial crime by federal authorities. The series was inspired by the investigations undertaken by Preet Bharara, the United States Attorney for the Southern District of New York in Manhattan from 2009 to 2017, on whom Rhoades is based. Bharara's 2013 prosecution of hedge fund manager Steven A. Cohen of S.A.C. Capital Advisors loosely influenced the first season, while Salomon Brothers' 1991 manipulation of U.S. Treasury bonds inspired the second. The series also interweaves subplots with Wendy Rhoades (Maggie Siff), a psychiatrist turned performance coach, Taylor Mason (Asia Kate Dillon), a market analyst, and Mike "Wags" Wagner (David Costabile), Axelrod's right-hand man.

The series has received generally positive reviews. Billions is considered the first American TV series to have a non-binary character (Taylor Mason). As such, it was nominated for Outstanding Drama Series in the 29th, 30th, 31st GLAAD Media Awards for its representation of the LGBTQ community. The series has been nominated for multiple Satellite Awards, a Critics' Choice Television Award and an Artios Award for Outstanding Achievement in Comedy Pilot Casting, the latter for its pilot episode. The show's coverage of the hedge fund industry has been recognized as realistic. The fifth season premiered on May 3, 2020; however, due to the COVID-19 pandemic, only 7 of the 12 episodes in that season aired that year. The fifth season resumed airing on September 5, 2021. In October 2020, the series was renewed for a sixth season which premiered on January 23, 2022. From the sixth season onwards, Lewis left the series and Corey Stoll took the lead role as Mike Prince. In February 2022, the series was renewed for a seventh season.

Plot
U.S. Attorney for the Southern District of New York Chuck Roades (Giamatti) goes after hedge fund manager and popular philanthropist Bobby "Axe" Axelrod (Lewis). A collision course, with each using all of their considerable smarts and influence to outmaneuver the other, looms.

Cast

Main 
 Paul Giamatti as Charles "Chuck" Rhoades, Jr.: U.S. Attorney for the Southern District of New York, who later attempts a run for governor of New York and is elected Attorney General of New York. Rhoades is ruthless and has a particular distaste for wealthy criminals who try to buy their way out of justice. Despite his significant power as U.S. Attorney, Rhoades struggles not to be overshadowed both by his higher-earning wife, Wendy, and by his well-connected, wealthy father. He went to Yale (as did his father) and has a blind trust of which his father is a trustee. In private, he is a sadomasochist and engages in BDSM role play with Wendy and other women, acting as a "slave." The character is loosely based on the careers of Preet Bharara and Eliot Spitzer.
 Damian Lewis as Robert "Bobby" Axelrod (main season 1–5; recurring season 7): an ambitious billionaire manager of the hedge fund Axe Capital and a Hofstra University graduate who came from humble beginnings. He was one of his firm's survivors of the September 11 attacks, reforming it as Axe Capital and paying the college tuition of the children of his colleagues who died in the World Trade Center. He is extremely charitable and generous in public, but uses insider trading and bribery to grow his firm's enormous wealth. He has animal-like instincts that make him extremely successful in his trading career. The character is loosely based on Steven A. Cohen and his former hedge fund S.A.C. Capital Advisors. At the end of season 5, Axelrod takes a deal in order to avoid going to jail for 15–25 years, and runs to Switzerland after having Mike Prince buy him out. 
 Maggie Siff as Wendy Rhoades: a psychiatrist, in-house performance coach at Axe Capital and wife of Chuck Rhoades, Jr. She is self-possessed, motivated, and extremely successful and went to Yale. She has a strong relationship with Axelrod, her boss, with whom she has been working for more than 15 years. She participates with Chuck in BDSM role play activities and dominates Chuck.
 Malin Åkerman as Lara Axelrod (starring season 1–3; guest season 4): wife and later ex-wife of Bobby Axelrod and a former nurse (who maintains her professional license). She is from a lower-class, blue-collar upbringing but has left her former self behind. She was devoted to her husband and their children. Her brother Dean was a firefighter who died during the 9/11 attacks. Lara disapproves of Axe's close relationship with Wendy.
 Toby Leonard Moore as Bryan Connerty (starring season 1–4; guest season 5), the Chief of the Securities and Commodities Fraud Task Force for the Southern District of New York and Rhoades's point man at the start of the series. He later succeeds Rhoades as U.S. Attorney for the Southern District of New York until he engages in illegal witness tampering, eventually spending time in prison for his crime. Chuck transfers him to a white-collar prison after making a deal with his brother. 
 David Costabile as Mike "Wags" Wagner: COO of Axe Capital and Axelrod's right-hand man. He is a known drug and sex addict and claims cocaine helps him focus on work. 
 Condola Rashad as Kate Sacker: a former head of crime and Assistant United States Attorney in the Southern District of New York, now attorney in Rhoades's office as Assistant to Attorney General of New York. She is biding her time until she has the opportunity to run for Congress. Her ultimate goal is to be President of the United States. In the sixth season, she betrays Rhoades to Michael Prince.
 Asia Kate Dillon as Taylor Amber Mason (recurring season 2; starring season 3–present): a talented financial analyst at Axe Capital who is of a non-binary gender. Mason becomes close to Axelrod and is appointed CIO of Axe Capital during his legal troubles. They later leave Axe Capital to form Taylor Mason Capital, which is later forced back to Axe Capital as a subsidiary in-house fund under Axelrod's control.
 Jeffrey DeMunn as Charles Rhoades, Sr. (recurring season 1–2; starring season 3–present): Chuck's father, a very wealthy and well-connected city/state power player who often uses his position to meddle in his son's affairs. He was abusive toward his ex-wife and frequently cheated on her. He had a child with, and then married, another woman.
 Kelly AuCoin as "Dollar" Bill Stearn (recurring seasons 1–3 & 6; starring seasons 4–5): a portfolio manager at Axe Capital with such loyalty to Axelrod that he would risk incriminating himself to save him. He was described by AuCoin as "the cheapest millionaire in America". Dollar Bill frequently resorts to insider trading and other legally dubious measures to create high returns for Axe Capital.
 Corey Stoll as Michael Thomas Aquinas Prince (recurring season 5; starring season 6) a business magnate, grew up as small town Indiana farm boy, who seemingly wants to give back to society. Prince attended New Castle High School where he was named Mr. Basketball as a senior. In season 6, he takes over Axe Capital, renaming it Michael Prince Capital, and he tries to win hosting duties for the 2028 Summer Olympics in New York.
 Daniel Breaker as Scooter Dunbar (recurring season 5; starring season 6): Michael Prince's right-hand man, later a co-right-hand alongside Wags.
 Sakina Jaffrey as Daevisha "Dave" Mahar (starring season 6): A new helper of Rhoades, who joined him in order to fight with corruption, but forced to take down Prince with Chuck.

Recurring

Episodes

Production

Development
The series was ordered by Showtime in March 2015, and the first season premiered on January 17, 2016. On January 26, 2016, the series was renewed for the second season, which premiered on February 19, 2017. Showtime confirmed in April 2017 that Asia Kate Dillon, who is non-binary, would be a series regular in the third season. Billions is considered to be the first American TV series to have a non-binary character.

Preet Bharara, the inspiration for U.S. Attorney Chuck Rhodes who was portrayed by Paul Giamatti, was somewhat critical of Giamatti's casting - jokingly referring to the Italian American actor as "noted Indian American actor Paul Giamatti".

On May 8, 2019, the series was renewed for a fifth season by Showtime, which premiered on May 3, 2020. Due to the COVID-19 pandemic, only 7 episodes from Season 5 have aired as of February 2021. On October 1, 2020, Showtime renewed the series for a sixth season and Corey Stoll was promoted to series regular, with remaining episodes of Season 5 set to air in 2021. On February 15, 2022, Showtime renewed the series for a seventh season.

Broadcast
The first episode was made available on January 1, 2016, via video on demand services in the U.S. and via CraveTV in Canada. It premiered on Stan in Australia on January 27, 2016 and in Canada on The Movie Network on January 17, 2016, simultaneous with the American broadcast.

Depiction of BDSM
The show captured the attention of the BDSM community, as it features numerous depictions of BDSM activitiy, and the two main characters of Charles "Chuck" Rhoades, Jr and his wife Wendy Rhoades engage in BDSM scenes numerous times in the early seasons of the show. In addition, season 4 of the show depicts the character of Chuck Rhoades coming out as a practitioner of BDSM in a public political speech. The show's producers retained the services of noted BDSM lifestyle expert Olivia Troy as a consultant to help ensure the activities are portrayed both accurately and safely.

Reception

Critical response

On Rotten Tomatoes, the series holds an overall approval rating of 88%, with a rating of 77% for season 1, 89% for season 2, 93% for season 3, 97% for season 4, and 86% for season 5. The site's critical consensus for the first season reads: "Despite a lack of likable characters, Billions soapy melodrama and larger-than-life canvas offer plenty of repeat viewing potential." For season 2 it reads: "An influx of new characters and a fresh narrative twist give Billions an added boost during its thoroughly entertaining second season." The site's critical consensus for the third season states: "Anchored by the performances of Paul Giamatti and Damian Lewis, the third season of Billions continues a convincing fable of greed, power and competition." On Rotten Tomatoes, the fourth season reads, "With tables turned and alliances formed, Billions fourth season goes full throttle with sharp dialogue, better rivalries, and bigger stakes." On Metacritic, the show has an overall score of 72. The first season has a weighted average score of 69 out of 100, based on reviews from 37 critics, indicating "generally favorable reviews", while the second season has a score of 67 out of 100, based on reviews from 6 critics, also indicating "generally favorable reviews". Praise for the series has steadily grown over time—also on Metacritic, its third season scored a 77 out of 100, while its fourth holds a score of 87 out 100 based on reviews from 4 critics, indicating "universal acclaim". The show's coverage of the hedge fund industry has been widely recognized as realistic.

In 2017, after introducing Taylor Mason (played by Asia Kate Dillon) in season 2, Billions became the first American TV series to have a non-binary character and actor. The series has received positive comments because of its representation of non-binary gender, with praise for its depiction of inclusion of gender-neutral singular they pronouns in the workplace.

Accolades

Lawsuits 
Billions has faced several lawsuits regarding both copyright infringement and defamation.

The first, brought by Denise Shull and the ReThink group in 2019 (Shull v Sorkin), alleged (among other things) that Billions ripped off Shull's book and based character "Wendy Rhoades" on her likeness. She also argues that Billions engaged her as a consultant on the show, but did not compensate or credit her for her time, as Shull claims is illustrated in a recently released video. The case was dismissed, but has since been appealed. In July, 2021, the U.S. Court of Appeals for the Second Circuit affirmed a lower court’s decision to dismiss the suit, saying that Shull’s book and the show are not substantially similar.

The second, brought by the Cayuga Nation in 2020, argued that Billions defamed both the nation and its federal representative. In the show, the nation is depicted engaging in acts such as the illegal operation of a casino business, blackmail, and bribery. One of the Cayuga characters featured on the show had the same last name and occupation as a real-life member. The case was dismissed, but the Cayuga Nation is considering its options regarding appeals.

See also 
 Prosecutorial career of Preet Bharara

References

External links

 
 

2010s American workplace drama television series
2010s American legal television series
2020s American workplace drama television series
2020s American legal television series
2016 American television series debuts
English-language television shows
Fictional rivalries
Mass media portrayals of the upper class
Serial drama television series
Showtime (TV network) original programming
Television shows directed by Steph Green
Television shows set in Connecticut
Television shows set in New York City
BDSM-related mass media
Television series about prosecutors